Gaynor Louise Barnes (born 27 September 1961) is a British presenter and journalist who was employed by ITV Yorkshire.

Barnes is a patron of Yorkshire Air Ambulance and The Prince of Wales Hospice in Pontefract.

Early life
She was born in Uxbridge in Middlesex. From 1973 to 1978, she went to St Dominic's Independent Grammar School for Girls (St Dominic's Sixth Form College since 1979) in Harrow on the Hill. From 1978 to 1980, she went to the independent Heathfield School in Harrow.

Career

BBC
From 1980 to 1991 she worked for the BBC in London as a research assistant in news and current affairs.  During this time she worked on BBC Question Time. After training as a journalist, Gaynor worked on local radio stations and on Breakfast Time, Newsnight, and Panorama.

ITV
She became a presenter for Calendar on 24 June 1991.

Barnes co-presented the South edition of Calendar from January 2007, however she was redeployed as a newsreader in February 2009, following the merger of north–south editions. Her colleague Christine Talbot took leave from co-presenting Calendar in January 2012, with Barnes acting as her fill-in for the remainder of the year; from January 2013 she was a news correspondent. In late 2014, Barnes replaced Kate Walby as the Friday female co-presenter, and as presenting the bulletins during Good Morning Britain on Tuesday, Wednesday and Thursday's, also as a relief presenter/newsreader when Talbot is absent.

Barnes presented the now-defunct magazine programme Tonight (between 1996 and 2000), and was the out-of-vision co-host for the 1997 Challenge TV remake of Winner Takes All.

After three decades, it was announced along with regular Friday co-presenter, John Shires, that they would be both leaving ITV Yorkshire at the end of March 2021.

In September 2021, Barnes received an Outstanding Contribution Award along with four of her fellow Calendar presenters at the Royal Television Society Yorkshire Programme Awards.

References

External links
 Gaynor Barnes on Twitter
 Gaynor Barnes at itv.com

British television newsreaders and news presenters
English television journalists
English television presenters
ITV regional newsreaders and journalists
People from the London Borough of Harrow
People from Uxbridge
Living people
1961 births
British women television journalists